The Kachhi is a geographical region of Punjab, Pakistan. It lies between the Thal Desert and the part of Chenab which flows after its confluence with the Jhelum River at Atharan Hazari in Jhang District. Parts of the districts of Kot Addu District and Layyah form this region.

See also
 Kacchi Plain

Regions of Punjab, Pakistan